Karim Ziad (born 1966) is an Algerian musician. A percussionist, drummer, singer and composer, Ziad's music melds influences from North African music and jazz. Ziad was involved in a hard rock band in his youth in Algiers, before moving to Paris to study biology, where he became a jazz drummer for Cheb Mami, Khaled and Idir, among others.

References

External links 

 Karim Ziad at Discogs

Algerian musicians
1966 births
Living people
Jazz drummers
Jazz composers
Jazz bandleaders
21st-century Algerian people